Phyllidia alyta is a species of sea slug, a dorid nudibranch, a shell-less marine gastropod mollusk in the family Phyllidiidae.

Distribution 
This species was described from Ari Atoll, Maldives. It has been found in the Indian Ocean from the Maldives, Mauritius, Réunion, Sri Lanka and Myanmar.

Description
This nudibranch has a grey coloured dorsum with white tubercles in rows separated by four longitudinal black stripes. The rhinophores are yellow and some of the dorsal tubercles are tipped with yellow.

Diet
This species feeds on sponges.

References

Phyllidiidae
Molluscs of the Indian Ocean
Gastropods described in 1996